Medford is a station in the hamlet of Medford, New York on the Main Line (Greenport Branch) of the Long Island Rail Road. Medford is located on New York State Route 112 between Peconic Avenue and Long Island Avenue. Access to the station is available from a narrow curving roadway leading off Route 112. This roadway used to connect with the Ohio Avenue intersection until Ohio Avenue was closed north of Peconic Avenue in 2007. It is also accessible from the north end of Oregon Avenue, although the Medford Fire Department periodically closes the Oregon Avenue access road for drills or other exercises.

History
Medford station was originally opened on June 26, 1844 when the main line terminated at the former Carman's River station east of Yaphank station. On August 20, 1863, the station burned down, but wasn't rebuilt until 1889. This version was a two-story structure located near an at-grade crossing with NY 112 that was considered one of the most dangerous crossings on the Long Island Rail Road. Demands for a bridge were ignored throughout the 1920s and 1930s. Only when a relative of a government official was killed at the crossing in 1940, was there any effort to build a bridge over Route 112. When the tracks were elevated, the station was rebuilt as a two-level station house along the embankment with the passenger waiting area on the top floor and an REA Express freight depot near the parking lot at ground-level. The bridge across NY 112, which has a low clearance of 12 feet, 9 inches, was designed for two tracks, but the second track was abandoned in the early 1960s. The station house was closed in 1958, with the first floor blocked off and second floor torn down in 1964 and filled in with dirt. A small wooden shelter was added to the platform in 1988, and was later replaced by a plexiglass one.

In the late 1990s, the station was rebuilt again in preparation for the new fleet of double-decker coaches, which require high-level platforms for boarding, and for future electrification of the line. In the rebuilding, the former ground-level platform was elevated, with a new stairway and a wheelchair access ramp from the parking area, and a small shelter was constructed at platform level. Parking at Medford station is free and unrestricted, in sharp contrast to the situation at many other LIRR stations.

A team track for freight service, provided by the New York & Atlantic Railway, since 1997, and formerly by the LIRR, for off-line customers, exists along the south side embankment of the track. This has been in place for several nearby building-products companies and their predecessors for many years since the elevation over Rte. 112 in the 1940s. When Holtsville station was closed on March 16, 1998, commuters from Holtsville were advised to use both Medford and Ronkonkoma stations, although more use Ronkonkoma. The station also contains a memorial to the victims of the September 11, 2001 terrorist attacks.

LIRR Demonstration Farm #2
Due to the success of the Long Island Rail Road Demonstration Farm on the Wading River Branch, a second one opened east of Medford station from 1907-1927. The site was also known as the Medford Prosperity Farm, and the remainder of site of the farm can be found near the Horse Block Road bridge over Long Island Avenue. Former President Theodore Roosevelt visited the farm on his 1910 "Whistle-Stop Campaign."

Station layout
This station has one high-level side platform south of the track that is long enough for one and a half cars to receive and discharge passengers. Other than the freight spur served by the New York & Atlantic Railway noted above, the Main Line has one track at this location.

Gallery

References

External links

 
Original Medford Station
Old Medford Station (LIRR Unofficial History Website)
Medford Railroad Station by Thomas R. Bayles (Longwood's Journey)
Unofficial LIRR Photography Site (lirrpics.com)
Medford Station
 Medford Avenue entrance from Google Maps Street View

Long Island Rail Road stations in Suffolk County, New York
Railway stations in the United States opened in 1844
Brookhaven, New York